Monetary reform of 1991 (known also as Pavlov Reform) was the last such reform in the Soviet Union. The reform had a confiscatory character. It began on January 22, 1991. Its architect was Minister of Finance Valentin Pavlov, who was to become the last prime minister of the Soviet Union on January 14 1991.

Overview
On 22 January 1991, President of the USSR Mikhail Gorbachev signed a decree on withdrawal from circulation and retirement of the 50- and 100-ruble banknotes of then-current 1961 issue. However, just two weeks prior to the signing, Pavlov had said in a speech that no such reforms would take place.

The signing of the Decree was reported on television at 21:00 pm Moscow time the same day. By that time, virtually all financial institutions and shops were closed for the day. People who learned of the news rushed to exchange their affected notes through institutions that were open late and potentially unaware, such as transit stations and taxis.

Some were able to send large remittances at late-open post offices, at railway stations, working 24 hours to relatives or to themselves. Some managed to purchase advance rail and air tickets and pay with affected notes with an intention to return them for a refund in still valid notes.

The reform included provision for the 50 and 100-ruble banknotes of 1961 standard to be redeemable for exchange in limited quantities per person or family through workplace-organized exchange locations to smaller-denomination banknotes or to new-issue (1991) bills of 50 and 100 rubles denomination.

The exchange was subject to significant limitations:

Deadline for exchange – for three days from 23 to 25 January (Wednesday to Friday).
No more than 1,000 rubles per person − additional exchange was to be requested as an exception, to be considered by a special commission until the end of March 1991.

However, actual exchange was also limited by the amount of cash available to exchange locations. Withdrawal at the Savings Bank of the USSR — the only consumer bank — was also limited to no more than 500 rubles per month per depositor.

In reality, deposits in several savings banks, including those in different cities, were allowed and common. As there was no technical way to link different accounts, an ad hoc decision was made to make notes of withdrawals on the last page of passports, where bank's officers made a mark of the amounts withdrawn from the deposit.

Results
Government plans succeeded only in part, and had tremendous negative effect: the confiscatory procedure withdrew from circulation 14 billion rubles in cash, but the surprise reform, which was intended to help in the fight against speculation, unearned income, counterfeiting, smuggling and corruption, resulted in a loss of public confidence in the government's actions.

Unpopular shock therapy reforms in the Soviet Union under the leadership of Pavlov continued.

On April 2, just as suddenly, consumer prices (then controlled by the government) increased about three-fold: for example, bread by 300%, a kilogram of beef by 400%, a litre of milk by 350%. Wages only increased by 20-30%, with a one-time payment of 60 rubles by the government. The reform was unable to prevent the collapse of the economy and the eventual political collapse of the Soviet Union.

External links

See also
 Indian 500 and 1000 rupee currency demonetisation

References

Reform in the Soviet Union
Monetary reform
Finance in Russia
Economic history of Russia
Finance in the Soviet Union
1991 in the Soviet Union
1991 in economics
Perestroika